This is a list of plays and musicals about the American Revolution.
 Valley Forge  -1934 play by Maxwell Anderson
 Ben Franklin in Paris  – 1964 musical by Sidney Michaels
 1776  – 1969 Broadway musical; Composed by Sherman Edwards
 The Ruckus at Machias  – 1976 play by Richard Sewell
 A New World: A Life of Thomas Paine  – 2009 stage play by Trevor Griffiths
 Jefferson's Garden  – 2015 stage play by Timberlake Wertenbaker
 Hamilton  – 2015 musical by Lin-Manuel Miranda
 Bloody Bloody Andrew Jackson  – 2006 musical by Alex Timbers and Michael Friedman

See also
 Founding Fathers of the United States
 Commemoration of the American Revolution
 List of films about the American Revolution
 List of television series and miniseries about the American Revolution

 

American Revolution
Plays and musicals